Pirali (also Romanized as Pīr‘alī and Pīr ‘Alī) is a Kurdish village in Dul Rural District, in the Central District of Urmia County, West Azerbaijan Province, Iran. At the 2006 census, its population was 370, in 96 families.

References 

Populated places in Urmia County